Bärbel Richter is a retired East German slalom canoeist who competed in the 1960s. She won three medals at the ICF Canoe Slalom World Championships, with two golds (K-1 team: 1965, 1967) and a bronze (K-1: 1967).

References
ICF medalists for Olympic and World Championships – Part 2: rest of flatwater (now sprint) and remaining canoeing disciplines: 1936–2007.

East German female canoeists
Possibly living people
Year of birth missing (living people)
Medalists at the ICF Canoe Slalom World Championships